Morea Baru (born April 15 1990) is a Papua New Guinean Olympic weightlifter. He competed at the 2016 Summer Olympics. He finished in 6th place. He competed at the 2020 Summer Olympics, in Men's −61 kg.

Career 
He competed at the 2016 Oceania Weightlifting Championship in Suva, Fiji and won with a total lift of 283 kg. Baru also participated at the Australian International Open in March 2016 and also took top honours with a total of 291 kg. He competed at the 2014 Commonwealth Games and finished fourth.

Major results

References

External links 
 

1990 births
Living people
Papua New Guinean male weightlifters
Weightlifters at the 2010 Commonwealth Games
Weightlifters at the 2014 Commonwealth Games
Weightlifters at the 2018 Commonwealth Games
Weightlifters at the 2022 Commonwealth Games
Commonwealth Games silver medallists for Papua New Guinea
Commonwealth Games medallists in weightlifting
Weightlifters at the 2016 Summer Olympics
Olympic weightlifters of Papua New Guinea
Weightlifters at the 2020 Summer Olympics
Medallists at the 2018 Commonwealth Games
Medallists at the 2022 Commonwealth Games